Can't We Fall in Love Again? is the fifth album by American soul singer-songwriter Phyllis Hyman. It was released by Arista Records in 1981.

The original album was mainly produced by previous collaborator, Norman Connors, but Chuck Jackson was brought in to mix and complete most of the tracks and to produce the title track, when Connors dropped out.

Track listing
Side One:
 "You Sure Look Good to Me" (Brian Potter, Rick Conedera) – 4:20
 "Don't Tell Me, Tell Her" (Doug James, Sandy Linzer) – 4:18
 "I Ain't Asking"  (Nickolas Ashford, Valerie Simpson) – 4:02
 "Can't We Fall in Love Again?" (Duet with Michael Henderson) (John Lewis Parker, Peter Ivers) – 5:17
Side Two:
 "The Love Too Good To Last" (Burt Bacharach, Carole Bayer Sager, Peter Allen) – 4:06
 "Tonight You and Me" (Bruce Hawes, Peyton Scott) – 3:45
 "Sunshine in My Life" (Larry Alexander, Phyllis Hyman) – 4:27
 "Just Another Face in the Crowd"  (Dennis Caldirola, Joe Ericksen) – 5:52

CD bonus tracks 

Tracks 9 to 11 were recorded at the 1980 sessions for the album, Can't We Fall in Love Again?

9. "Sleep On It" (Andrew Kastner, Larry McNally) – 3:20

10. "If You Ever Change Your Mind" (David Batteau, Richard Calhoun, Scott Shelley) – 2:58

11. "In Between the Heartaches" (Burt Bacharach, Hal David) – 3:45

Track 12 was from a recording session with Philadelphia producer, John Davis for her 1977 album on Buddah.

12. "You're the One" (unknown) – 5:23

Track 13 was recorded in 1982 with producer Thom Bell

13. "I'm Not Asking You To Stay" (Joseph Jefferson, Richard Roebuck) – 4:22

Personnel

 John Barnes - keyboards
 Gary Bartz - saxophone
 Michael Boddicker - synthesizer
 Eddie "Bongo" Brown - percussion
 Sonny Burke - Fender Rhodes
 Mayra Casales - percussion
 Leon "Ndugu" Chancler - drums
 Tony Coleman - percussion, backing vocals
Paulinho Da Costa - percussion
 Krystal Davis - backing vocals
 Nathan East - bass
 Paul Fox - synthesizer programming
 James Gadson - drums
 Marlo Henderson - guitar
 James Ingram - backing vocals
 Chuck Jackson, Maxine Brown - percussion, backing vocals

 Darryl Jackson - percussion
 Nick Johnson - backing vocals
 The Jones Girls - backing vocals
 Bobby Lyle - synthesizer, piano
 Tim May - guitar
 David T. Walker - guitar
 Julia Tillman Waters - backing vocals
 Oren Waters - backing vocals
 Eddie N. Watkins Jr. - bass
 Cheryl McWhorter - backing vocals
 Melvin Webb - percussion
 Maxine Willard - backing vocals
 Janet Wright - backing vocals
 Michael Henderson - backing vocals
George Bohanon - horns

Production
 Producer: Maxine Brown, Norman Connors, Chuck Jackson
 Arranger: Paul Riser
 Vocal Arrangement: Jean Carn
 Rhythm Arrangements: McKinley Jackson
 Engineers: Carla Bandini, Maxine Brown, Steve Hall, Chuck Jackson, Frank Kejmar, Cozy Noda, Jackson Swartz, Steve Williams
 Assistant engineers: Bob Winard
 Mixing: Maxine Brown, Tony Coleman, Chuck Jackson, Frank Kejmar.
 Production Coordination: Tony Coleman

References

External links
 

1981 albums
Arista Records albums
Albums arranged by Paul Riser
Phyllis Hyman albums
Soft rock albums by American artists
Pop albums by American artists